Egor Egorovich Mednikov  (born  June 3, 1949) is  Soviet football player, goalkeeper, coach.

References

External links
 

1949 births
Living people
Soviet footballers
Association football goalkeepers
FC Lokomotiv Kaluga players
FC Spartak Moscow players
FC Zimbru Chișinău players
SC Tavriya Simferopol players
FC Zhenis Astana players
FC Kairat players
FC Kaisar players
Russian football managers
Expatriate footballers in Kazakhstan
Russian expatriate sportspeople in Kazakhstan
Russian expatriate football managers
Expatriate football managers in Kazakhstan
Sportspeople from Kaluga Oblast
People from Lyudinovsky District